James Turner Welldon (3 August 1847 – 6 February 1927) was an English first-class cricketer active 1867 to 1869 who played for Kent and Cambridge University. He was born in Tonbridge; died in Ashford, Kent.

References

1847 births
1927 deaths
English cricketers
Kent cricketers
Marylebone Cricket Club cricketers
Cambridge University cricketers
Gentlemen of England cricketers